"Latest Trends" is the debut single by UK Drill duo A1 x J1. It was originally previewed in late 2020 before being officially released on 4 February 2021. It later found viral popularity on TikTok before reaching a peak of number two on the UK Singles Chart in March 2021 after being remixed with a version featuring Aitch or a version with A Boogie wit da Hoodie.

Composition 
The song has been described by GRM Daily as having "a feel-good vibe with its upbeat, guitar-based production" as well as "clever lyrics including pop culture references and Instagram caption worthy lines". The duo also contribute "smooth vocals from A1 on the chorus and his verse" before "J1 comes through with clever wordplay and bars".

Charts

Weekly charts

Australia (ARIA) | 68

Year-end charts

Certifications

References

2021 debut singles
2020 songs
A1 x J1 songs
Aitch (rapper) songs
EMI Records singles